Gina Villalobos is an American singer-songwriter and composer. From 1992 thorough 2013, she extensively toured and recorded in the United States, the UK and Europe, writing songs and making music in bands and as a solo artist. Counting her most recent release, Sola (2014), Villalobos has released five solo studio albums. She continues to sing and compose in her work as a music creator at Feverpitch, where she services the motion picture industry, specifically those companies making movie trailer music. She creates sound effects, produces music, and composes original scores.

Early life 
Villalobos spent her childhood in the Santa Monica Mountain community of Lake Sherwood, California. By way of inspiration, Gina's mother handed down her passion for music, while her father Reynaldo Villalobos is an acclaimed cinematographer and director. By the time she was seven, Villalobos was teaching herself guitar, and began her music career at the end of college.

Musical career 
In her early 20s, Villalobos fronted and played guitar in the acoustic folk trio Liquid Sunshine. Together, they recorded the albums Sweet Commitment and Barbary Lane, as well as the self-titled Liquid Sunshine EP before disbanding in 1996. Between 1997 and 2001, Villalobos fronted the band The Mades, with whom she recorded two albums, before starting her solo career with 2002's Beg From Me.

In 2004, she caught the attention of respected U.S. publications like Paste, No Depression, Acoustic Guitar, and Harp. In anticipation of her sophomore studio album, Live from KXLU Radio was released, containing a live recording with songs off the new album. With her second outing, Rock 'N' Roll Pony, the European press and radio praised the CD, which reached No. 3 on the Euro-Americana charts, and by 2005, Villalobos was performing in Europe, Australia, and New Zealand. She toured with Laura Veirs in 2005 on her UK tour.  Her 2007 self-release Miles Away repeated her previous successes in the U.K. press and on BBC Radio 2. Around that time, the alternative rock band World Party invited Villalobos to tour the States with them, and her songs started showing up in movies and TV shows like One Tree Hill and Army Wives. Two years later, Gina delivered Days on Their Side.

Villalobos has been associated with Anne McCue, and has been recognized for her contribution to California songs.

In 2014, after an extended hiatus and having taken the time to produce the album since January 2012, Sola was released. She produced and Erik Colvin engineered, as he's done for each of her previous three offerings. Augmenting Gina's vocals and guitar are guitarist Kevin Haaland (Andy Grammer), back for his fourth Gina Villalobos album, and returning guitarist Josh Grange (Sheryl Crow, k.d. lang, Beck, Dixie Chicks); Also credited are Eric Heywood (Son Volt, Ray LaMontagne, The Pretenders, Alejandro Escovedo) on pedal steel. Upright bass was performed by Ian Walker (k.d. lang, Cher, Paula Cole, The Ditty Bops). Quinn (Tracy Chapman, Daft Punk, Paula Cole) was the drummer.

In late 2015, The Golden Globe Award and Emmy Award-winning Amazon Studios TV show, Transparent selected the arrangement featuring the 
Gina Villalobos/Eric Colvin produced version of the 1971 Sly and the Family Stone hit "Family Affair" featuring the vocals of Ruby Friedman for use in the trailer promoting the launch of Season 2.

Discography

Studio albums

Live albums

Singles

CD Compilations 

 Paste Magazine Sampler Number 32
 Sin City Social Cub Compilation Volume 9

TV and Film Work 

 Army Wives Great Expectations Season 2, Episode 12:  I'm Alright
 Real Sex

Personal life 
Villalobos resides in the Los Angeles community of Los Feliz, California.

In October 2003, halfway through the sessions for Rock 'N Roll Party, production was halted when Villalobos sustained serious injury to her right eye.  After numerous retinal surgeries, she was informed she would be permanently blind in her right eye.

References

External links 
 Gina Villalobos official website
 
 
 Gina Villalobos Music on iTunes
 
 Feverpitch official website

1970 births
American alternative country singers
American country singer-songwriters
American women country singers
American women pop singers
American women singer-songwriters
American indie pop musicians
21st-century American composers
Living people
Musicians from Los Angeles
Singer-songwriters from California
21st-century American singers
21st-century American women singers
Country musicians from California
21st-century women composers
People from Los Feliz, Los Angeles